Rajpura Junction railway station(station code: RPJ) is a railway station serving Rajpura city in Patiala district, Punjab, India. Rajpura is the administrative headquarter of Rajpura subdivision of Patiala district. This station is under the Ambala railway division of the Northern Railway Zone of Indian Railways. This station is categorized in Non-Suburban Group as category NSG4 station by Indian Railways.

Overview 
This station is located on the double track,  broad gauge, Ambala–Sirhind section of Ambala–Attari line and single track BG Bathinda–Rajpura line.

Electrification
As of 2016, electrification of the single broad-gauge railway line is in progress. The electrification trail between Rajpura and Dhuri was completed on 10 September 2019.  The 68 km-long stretch from Dhuri station to Lehra Muhabbat station near Bathinda on Bathinda–Rajpura line was completed in July 2020 after clearance by Commission of Railway Safety(CRS).

Network

Amenities 
Rajpura railway station has 10 booking windows and one enquiry office. The station has all basic amenities like drinking water, public toilets, waiting hall, sheltered area with adequate seating on platforms. The station had footfall of 5445 persons per day in 2018. Wheelchair availability is there for disabled persons. There are three platforms at the station and two foot overbridge connecting platforms.

See also
 List of railway stations in Punjab

References

Ambala railway division
Railway stations in Patiala district